RCMS may refer to:

 Rachel Carson Middle School, Virginia, United States
 Radio Colony Model School, a school in Dhaka, Bangladesh
 Rastriya Colliery Majdoor Sangh, Indian trade union
 Research Center for Modeling and Simulation, Pakistan
 Rowan County Middle School, a middle school in Morehead, Kentucky
 Royal Canadian Medical Service